Mount Weld mine is a rare earth mine in Western Australia, located about  south of Laverton and  east of Leonora. It ranks as one of the richest major rare-earth deposits in the world.

Rare earths are contained in secondary phosphates and aluminophosphates, presumably derived from weathering of the Proterozoic Mount Weld carbonatite.  The primary commercial interest at the site is targeted towards oxides as well as further niobium and tantalum deposits within the intrusive pipe of the Mount Weld carbonatite, which is approximately three kilometers (1.9 mi) in diameter.

The main deposits are hosted within the soil and regolith horizon that blankets the entire carbonatite and form shallow lenses within  of the surface. The most important rare-earth oxide deposit, the Central Lanthanide Deposit, CLD, is located at the center of the carbonatite with the niobium/tantalum and other deposits generally located towards outer fringes. Discovered in 1988, the CLD represents a spectacular enrichment of rare-earth deposit sediments. The deposit is believed to be the largest and highest grade of its type in the world.

The Mount Weld deposit is owned by ASX-listed Lynas Corporation, which raised A$450 million equity from J. P. Morgan in 2009 to fund the development of a mine and also a processing plant in Kuantan, Malaysia.  Once operational, the Mount Weld mine is expected to be the largest source of rare-earth elements outside of China.

Mining began at the Mount Weld site in 2011.

References

Further reading

External links
 MINEDEX website: Mt Weld REE / Lynas Database of the Department of Mines, Industry Regulation and Safety

Surface mines in Australia
Mines in Western Australia
Rare earth mines
Shire of Laverton